Andrij (also Andrii) Kravets (born December 12, 1990, Rivne) is a 1-dan professional Go player from Ukraine; member of numerous international amateur competitions (3rd European Pro Qualification, 2016) and previous Ukrainian Champion (2012, 2015).

Go career 

1999 – started to play.

2002 – 1st place, Youth Go Championship in category under 12, Prague. 

2006 – Promoted to 4-dan.

2008 – Promoted to 5-dan.

2008 – Represented Ukraine in the 1st World Mind Sports competition, Beijing.

2010 – 2nd place in Ukrainian Championship (High League), Kyiv.

2011, 2012, 2013 – 3rd place in the European Team Championship.

2012 – Promoted to 6-dan.

2012 – 3rd place in 5th Shusaku Cup, Targu Mures.

2012 – 3rd place in European Iwamoto Memorial Tournament, Amsterdam.

2012 and 2015 – 1st place in Ukrainian Championship (High League), Kyiv.

2017 – 1st place in the 4th Pro Qualification Tournament, thus awarded 1-dan professional status by the European Go Federation.

References

1990 births
Living people
Ukrainian Go players